Juliana Pasha (born 20 May 1980) is an Albanian singer. In 2010, she won Honorary Citizen Award of Burrel from the mayor of the city. After she went into Eurovision in 2010 she won the first prize in the festival "Kenga Magjike" with the song called "Sa e shite zemren". She was a mentor and judge on the first series of Albania and Kosovo's version of The X Factor.

Eurovision 2010

On 27 December 2009, Pasha won the national final to represent Albania in the Eurovision Song Contest 2010. She had previously taken part in the 2007 and 2008 festivals, placing 3rd and 2nd respectively with "Qielli i ri" and "Një jetë", the latter a duet with Luiz Ejlli. In the contest, she qualified to the final, where she performed fifteenth, following the Turkish representants MaNga and preceding Iceland's Hera Björk, and placed 16th out of 25 contestants, receiving 62 points, which included a 12-point set from Macedonia.

Personal life
When the media asked her how important religion is for her – she said it is very important because she believes in God and that she is here because of His help. She has also been involved in a project called Hanna (PH), who are fighting to remove the blood vengeance tradition in Albania.

Awards 

Kënga Magjike

|-
||2005
||"Ti Une"
|Çesk Zadeja Prize
|
|-
||2008
||"1000 Arsye"
|Critic Prize
|
|-
||2010
||"Sa e shite zemren (ft.Luiz Ejlli)"
|First Prize
|
|-
|rowspan="2"|2012
|rowspan="2"|"Diamant"
|Best Vocal
|
|-
|Third Prize
|
|-
|rowspan="2"|2015
|rowspan="2"|"Vullkan"
|Best Vocal
|
|-
|Third Prize
| 
|}

Kult Award

|-
||2016
||"Vullkan"
|Best Song of the Year
| 
|}

References

1980 births
Living people
21st-century Albanian women singers
Eurovision Song Contest entrants for Albania
Eurovision Song Contest entrants of 2010
People from Mat (municipality)
Albanian Christians
Festivali i Këngës winners
Kënga Magjike winners